Charles Frederick Rutter (22 December 1927 – 19 October 2012) was an English professional footballer.

Born in Bromley, Rutter was playing non-league football for Taunton Town when he was spotted by Cardiff City who offered him a full contract with the club. He made his debut in a 0–0 draw with Doncaster Rovers in 1950. His performances in the 1951–52 season earned him a call-up for the England B team. Towards the end of that season he sustained a serious knee injury in a match against Notts County which kept him out for the whole of the following season. On his return he found his place in the squad taken by Ron Stitfall and, although he stayed at the club until 1958, he struggled to break into the side again. He returned to non-league football after leaving Cardiff, including briefly managing Kent club Sittingbourne.

After his retirement from football, Rutter set up his own tropical bird business in Cardiff's central market.

References

1927 births
2012 deaths
English footballers
Taunton Town F.C. players
Cardiff City F.C. players
English Football League players
England B international footballers
Association football defenders